Hannan Street is the main street in the goldfields town of Kalgoorlie, Western Australia, and the easternmost section of Great Eastern Highway.

It is the location of many historic buildings and establishments. The photographs available of the street in the 20th century reflect the changes in the main thoroughfare of the town.

Significant buildings located in the street
 Exchange Hotel
Kalgoorlie Hotel
 Kalgoorlie Miner building
 Palace Hotel
 York Hotel

References

 
Roads in Kalgoorlie-Boulder